Ana María Rodríguez may refer to:

 Ana María Rodríguez (writer) (born 1958), American children's author
 Ana María Rodríguez (alpine skier) (born 1962), Spanish former alpine skier
 Ana Maria Rodriguez (politician) (born 1977), Republican member of the Florida Senate

See also 
 Maria Rodriguez (disambiguation)
 Ana Rodríguez (disambiguation)